Lizhou District is a district in Guangyuan, Sichuan, China.

Lizhou or Li Prefecture may also refer to:
 Lizhou, a former prefecture in roughly modern Tianlin County, Guangxi, China
 Lizhou, a former prefecture in roughly modern Harqin Banner, Inner Mongolia, China
 Lizhou, a former prefecture in roughly modern Hanyuan County, Sichuan, China
 Lizhou, a former prefecture in roughly modern Xun County, Henan, China
 Lizhou, a former prefecture in roughly modern Jiangchuan County, Yunnan, China
 Lizhou, a former prefecture in modern Beijing, China 

 Hebei Lizhou BOB Rural Commercial Bank , a rural commercial bank, located in Li County, Baoding, Hebei

See also
 Li County (disambiguation)
 Yeoju (Korean equivalent)